Reine Tore Leif Wisell (30 September 1941 – 20 March 2022) was a Swedish racing driver. He participated in 23 Formula One World Championship Grands Prix, debuting on 4 October 1970.  He achieved one podium, and scored a total of 13 championship points.

Career
He also participated in several non-Championship Formula One races. He won the Swedish Formula Three Championship in 1967 and three years later he made the big step and signed with Team Lotus who were the best team this year.

In the 1970 United States Grand Prix in Watkins Glen, Wisell raced for Lotus who made their return in the championship after Jochen Rindt's death at Monza. Rindt's death caused his teammate John Miles to retire and Wisell replaced him.

His first Grand Prix was the best in his career as he achieved a third-place finish, trailing only his teammate and future champion Emerson Fittipaldi and Pedro Rodríguez and finishing ahead of title contender Jacky Ickx. This result was Wisell's best, as the subsequent years were not at the same high level, and he retired after his home Grand Prix in 1974.

Death
Wisell died suddenly on 20 March 2022, aged 80, in his Thailand home.

Career results

Complete Formula One World Championship results
(key)

24 Hours of Le Mans results

References

External links
Profile at grandprix.com

1941 births
2022 deaths
Swedish racing drivers
Swedish Formula One drivers
Team Lotus Formula One drivers
BRM Formula One drivers
March Formula One drivers
24 Hours of Le Mans drivers
World Sportscar Championship drivers
People from Motala Municipality
Sportspeople from Östergötland County